Isabella Janet Florentina Summers (born 31 October 1980) is an English musician, songwriter, producer, remixer and composer.  She is a founding member of English indie rock band Florence and the Machine.

Biography
Summers lived her first nine years in Hackney, London, and met Florence Welch as the young Summers would babysit Welch's younger sister Grace.  When Summers was nine, her family moved to Aldeburgh, Suffolk. There Summers attended Woodbridge School, had piano lessons and grew an interest in music, crediting some influence from mixtapes made by her father with a very eclectic mixture of everything and anything from Beethoven to Bob Dylan, rarities, poetry, even the Shipping forecast". Hip-hop was a preferred genre, as her neighbours gave her a tape with Snoop Dogg's Doggystyle (1993) and 6 Feet Deep (1994) by Gravediggaz, and she would also spend evenings with fishermen's sons "who smoked loads of weed and listened to hard American rap."

For her university years, Summers moved back to London in East Dulwich, where she would get a fine arts degree at Central Saint Martins. In the meantime she bought a set of DJ mixers to learn how to mix, while also doing side jobs such as being a runner for Top of the Pops and transcriptions and film digitizing for Alan Parker. Soon she was working with Dan Greenpeace on his 'All City Show' radio show on XFM London, an experience that led Summers to buy her first MPC which was installed at the cupboard of her shared flat. With the help of a friend she started a studio in a former plastics factory at Crystal Palace, and began making hip hop. During this time, Summers worked with, amongst others, Kashmere, The Iguana Man, IRS Crew, MBC Crew, Inja and The Last Skeptik. She would also have meetings with Welch during DJ work and art school, as Welch was attending the Camberwell College of Arts.

As Summers was hired to remix songs by the band Ludes, Welch became a more common sight at her studio given she was dating Ludes' guitarist Matt Alchin, and even impressed Summers with her singing. One day, as Summers got into a creative rut, which she described as getting "sick of boys telling me what to do", she thought of writing pop music with a woman, and invited Welch to make songs with her. Following a day joining Summers' beats with Welch's lyrics, soon they were creative partners, with Welch nicknaming Summers "Isabella Machine" for her electronic music skills. This led to their performing together for a time under the name Florence Robot/Isa Machine. The project was renamed Florence and the Machine as according to Welch "that name was so long it'd drive me mad." Summers had only thought of being a producer but ended up as the group's keyboardist, with her second gig being right at the 2007 Glastonbury Festival. Summers has writing and producing credits in Florence and the Machine's first three albums Lungs (2009), Ceremonials (2011) and How Big, How Blue, How Beautiful (2015), where she also played piano and percussion.

Summers has also written, produced and remixed tracks for artists including Beyoncé, Juliette Lewis, Jennifer Hudson, Jasmine Thompson, Cara Delevingne, Chloe x Halle, Flux Pavilion, Rita Ora, Judith Hill, LP  and The Game.

Summers had created the main title song "Was It Love" for the Sky Atlantic series Riviera, and provided her friend Sam Levinson the song "Rage" for his film Assassination Nation (2018), when right after finishing the High as Hope Tour, that film's music supervisor Mary Ramos invited Summers for her first composing gig in a team-up with Mark Isham, scoring the Hulu miniseries Little Fires Everywhere, which won her a Primetime Emmy Award nomination. Summers followed it by composing the score for the Prime Video series Panic alongside Brian H. Kim, and Netflix's Sex/Life in another collaboration with Isham. Her first solo composing gig was the Apple TV show Physical, whose 1980s setting led to a score full of "crazy synths and over-the-top guitar solos". Afterwards Summers scored her first movie, Call Jane (2022), and the Paramount+ show The Offer.

Summers is working on her first solo album which is set for release in spring 2022. It will feature multiple guest vocalists.

Discography

References

External links
 
 
 

Living people
1980 births
English record producers
People from Aldeburgh
English songwriters
English rock keyboardists
Pop keyboardists
British indie pop musicians
People educated at Woodbridge School
People from Hackney Central
English film score composers
English television composers
Florence and the Machine members